The dpon-chen or pönchen, literally the "great authority" or "great administrator", was the chief administrator or governor of Tibet located at Sakya Monastery during the Yuan administrative rule of Tibet in the 13th and 14th centuries. In the Mongol Empire the office of the dpon-chen was established in the 1260s and functioned as the Tibetan government serving the Mongol emperors of the Yuan dynasty, unlike the Sakya Imperial Preceptors (Dishi) who were active at the Yuan court.

The Mongols set up a government agency and top-level administrative department known as the Bureau of Buddhist and Tibetan Affairs in Khanbaliq (modern Beijing) that supervised Buddhist monks in addition to managing the territory of Tibet; one of the department's purposes was to select a dpon-chen to govern Tibet when the Sakya Lama (e.g. Drogön Chögyal Phagpa) was away. The Dpon-Chen was invariably a Tibetan nominated by the ruling Sakya Lama and approved by the reigning emperor. His function was, apart from being the chief executive head of the Sakya Government, to appoint a tripön for each of the 13 myriarchies, and to act as liaison between the Yuan government and Tibet. Nevertheless, this system also led to conflicts between the Sakya leaders and the dpon-chens. While dpon-chens had a small army in Sakya itself, their major military support came from the Mongols or Yuan dynasty when an internal rebellion or external invasion occurred. As Yuan declined in the mid-14th century however, in Tibet, Tai Situ Changchub Gyaltsen toppled the Sakya and founded the Phagmodrupa Dynasty, marking the end of the dpon-chen system.

See also
 Tibet under Yuan rule
 Bureau of Buddhist and Tibetan Affairs
 Sakya (Tibetan Buddhist school)
 List of rulers of Tibet

References

Government of the Yuan dynasty
History of Tibet
Sakya
Titles